Aur Airport is a public use airstrip at Aur on Aur Atoll, Marshall Islands. This airstrip is assigned the location identifier AUL by the IATA.

Facilities
Aur Airport has one runway measuring 2,100 ft (640 m).

Airlines and destinations

References

Airports in the Marshall Islands